Milan Kucera may refer to:

Milan Kučera (canoeist) (born 1963), Czechoslovak slalom canoer
Milan Kučera (Nordic combined) (born 1974), Czech-Czechoslovak Nordic combined skier